Dan Lee (May 19, 1969 – January 15, 2005) was a Canadian-American animator, best known as the character designer of Nemo, the title character from Finding Nemo.

Early life 
He was born in Montreal, Quebec, in 1969, the youngest of four children of Chinese immigrants and grew up in Scarborough, Ontario, a suburb of Toronto. He graduated with honours from the animation program at Sheridan College in Oakville, Ontario.

Career 
He worked on television cartoons and commercials for several studios, including Kennedy Cartoons in Toronto and Colossal Pictures in San Francisco before joining Pixar in June 1996.

He worked as animator on Darkwing Duck, and Goof Troop while at Kennedy Cartoons.

Personal life 
Lee died January 15, 2005, in Berkeley, California, at the age of 35 years old, from heart failure and complications of lung cancer, where he immigrated in June 2003. Ratatouille was dedicated to Lee.

Filmography

 A Bug's Life (1998) ... Additional Character Designer, Animator, Sketch Artist
 Toy Story 2 (1999) ... Character Designer: new characters, Sketch Artist
 Monsters, Inc. (2001) ... Additional Character Designer
 Finding Nemo (2003) ... Character Designer
 Lifted (2006) ... Production Art
 Ratatouille (2007) ... Character Design

References

Canadian Creator of Pixar's Nemo dies

External links

1969 births
2005 deaths
Anglophone Quebec people
Artists from Montreal
Canadian animators
Sheridan College animation program alumni
Pixar people